Brown's Lake Bog is a dedicated Ohio state nature preserve owned by The Nature Conservancy. It is one of the few remaining kettle peatlands in the U.S. state of Ohio. It has a kettle lake, kame, and a floating sphagnum moss mat. Public visitation is allowed.

It is located in southwestern Wayne County near the village of Shreve. It was designated a National Natural Landmark in 1967.

References

External links 
Brown's Lake Bog Preserve - The Nature Conservancy
Brown's Lake Bog State Nature Preserve

Bogs of Ohio
National Natural Landmarks in Ohio
Nature reserves in Ohio
Nature Conservancy preserves
Kames
Protected areas of Wayne County, Ohio
Landforms of Wayne County, Ohio
Protected areas established in 1966
1966 establishments in Ohio